Hassan Ibrahim (born May 17, 1982), better known by his stage name, Happy Famba, is a Burundian recording artist, singer, songwriter and performer.

Biography
Ibrahim was born on May 17, 1982, in Buyenzi, Burundi, at the Prince Regent Charles Hospital, to Burundian parents Hassan Karunguka and Celine Kiyaboba. In 1997, when he was 15 years old, his mother was killed. His father died in 1999.

History
In 2000, the Orchestra Happy World Centre Jeune Kamenge hired Happy Famba as "Framer of Dance".  It was an opportunity for him to learn to sing. In 2003, he released his first song, "Ndani Ya Club". This placed him in the ranks of popular singers in Burundi. In the same year, PSI Burundi signed him to a contract for a tour in the provinces of the country during the campaign against AIDS.

In 2007, he released the song "My Dear", and he released "Shamila" in 2008, with the participation of Mr Blue Tanzania. That year, he also released "Baby Girl" (featuring Jay Fire), "Naogopa" (featuring Black-G), and performed several shows in Congo and Rwanda.

In 2010, the singer Kidum offered to help during Happy Famba's Burundi Primusic tour and also participated in the Fespade festival in Rwanda.

On the occasion of International Women's Day in 2013, the same day of the launch of his album, Happy Mamba gave a free-admission concert to honor the memory of his mother, who didn't have the opportunity to see him perform. On May 1, 2014, during the ceremonies of the day of international workers, he made a proposal to five musicians to sing the song "Abakozi" with him for Pierre Nkurunziza, President of the Republic of Burundi.

During the month of February 2014, he met a Manager called Takis, who has a recording studio called African Sound Records, with whom he later signed.

Happy Famba started 2015 with two singles, "Ni Wewe" and "Collabo" (featuring Channy Queen & Krazy Bright), the fourth and fifth songs from his album Collabo.

Discography
The discography of Happy Famba consists of two studio albums.

Studio albums

Music videos
As lead artist

Awards and nominations

Top Ten Tube Music Awards

|-
| rowspan="1"|2013
|Jigi Jigiwe
|Video of the Year
|
|-

Isanganiro Awards

|-
| rowspan="1"|2011
|My Dear
|Song of the Year
|
|-

References

1982 births
Living people
Burundian male singers